Stictea is a genus of moths belonging to the subfamily Olethreutinae of the family Tortricidae.

Delimitation of this genus versus Strepsicrates is not fully resolved, and some species now listed here were formerly placed there.

Species
Stictea charopa (Meyrick, 1888)
Stictea coriariae (Oku, 1974)
Stictea cryptosema (Diakonoff, 1983)
Stictea dilacerata (Meyrick, 1929)
Stictea discobola (Diakonoff, 1968)
Stictea dyselia (Turner, 1946)
Stictea ejectana (Walker, 1863) (= S. holotephras)
Stictea emplasta (Meyrick, 1901)
Stictea fenestrata (Walsingham, 1907)
Stictea glaucothoe (Meyrick, 1927)
Stictea infensa (Meyrick, 1911)
Stictea inobtrusa (Diakonoff, 1968)
Stictea limnephilana (Meyrick, 1881)
Stictea macropetana (Meyrick, 1881)
Stictea mygindiana ([Denis & Schiffermuller], 1775)
Stictea sphenophora (Turner, 1946)

See also
List of Tortricidae genera

References

External links
tortricidae.com

Olethreutini
Tortricidae genera
Taxa named by Achille Guenée